Polynomial identity may refer to:

 Algebraic identities of polynomials  (see Factorization)
 Polynomial identity ring
 Polynomial identity testing